Santo Amaro is a town in São Tomé and Príncipe. It is located in Lobata District, northern São Tomé Island. Its population is 1063 (2012 census). It lies 0.8 km north of Bela Vista, 3 km east of Conde and 6 km northwest of the city centre of the capital São Tomé.

Population history

References

Populated places in Lobata District